Gudur mandal may refer to any of the following mandals in India:

 Gudur mandal, Mahabubabad district, in Mahabubabad district
 Gudur mandal, Nellore district, in Nellore district

See also 
 Guduru mandal, Krishna district